Saint-Chéron is a commune in the Essonne department in Île-de-France in northern France.

The village is named after Saint Caraunus, a missionary who was murdered by robbers in the vicinity.

Population
Inhabitants of Saint-Chéron are known as Saint-Chéronnais in French.

See also
Communes of the Essonne department

References

External links

Official website 

Mayors of Essonne Association 

Communes of Essonne